Yantaringa railway station was located about 41 kilometres from Adelaide railway station on the Adelaide to Wolseley railway line.

History 
Yantaringa station and siding opened sometime around 1883. The station, which takes its name from an aboriginal word for "big lookout", was located in the Adelaide Hills suburb of Verdun, and is a few hundred metres to the east of the Yantaringa Tunnel.

In 1925 it became a stopping place for rail motors. The station/siding closed in 1964.

See also
 Bridgewater railway line

References

Disused railway stations in South Australia
Railway stations in Australia opened in 1883
Railway stations closed in 1964